Eurovision Choir is a choral competition held biennially from 2017. The contest was created by the European Broadcasting Union (EBU) and is the latest competition in the Eurovision Family of Events. Only members of the EBU may take part in the contest. Nine countries took part in the inaugural contest.

Participants
The European Broadcasting Union (EBU) announced on 8 August 2016 that a new competition was to be launched, which would involve choirs representing countries who have member broadcasters within the EBU, to compete for the title "Choir of the Year". The official launch was announced on 28 February 2017. Nine countries took part in the inaugural contest.

Listed are all the countries that have ever taken part in the competition, alongside the year in which they made their debut:

Other EBU members
The following list of countries have Active EBU Membership and are eligible to participate in Eurovision Choir, but have opted to not participate.

  – RTSH
  – EPTV, ENRS, TDA
  – RTVA
  – ARMTV, ARMR
  – İTV
  – BHRT
  – BNR, BNT
  – HRT
  – CyBC
  – ČR
  – ERTU
  – Yle
  – GRF, TF1, E1, C+
  – GPB
  – ERT
  – RÚV
  – RTÉ
  – KAN
  – RAI
  – JRTV
  – TL
  – LNC
  – RTL, ERSL
  –  PBS
  – TRM
  – GRMC, TMC
  – RTCG
  – SNRT
  – NPO
  – MRT
  – TVP
  – RTP
  – ROR, TVR
  – SMRTV
  – RTS
  – RTVS
  – RTVE
  – ERTT
  – TRT
  – UA:PBC
  – BBC
  – RV

Participating countries in the decades

2010s

Broadcast in non-participating countries

Host cities

List of winners

By contest

By country
The table below shows the top-three placings from each contest, along with the years that a country won the contest.

See also 
 List of countries in the Eurovision Song Contest
 List of countries in the Eurovision Dance Contest
 List of countries in the Eurovision Young Dancers
 List of countries in the Eurovision Young Musicians
 List of countries in the Junior Eurovision Song Contest

Notes and references

Notes

References

 
Eurovision Choir of the Year